The Battle of Boulogne in 1940 was the defence of the port of Boulogne-sur-Mer by French, British and Belgian troops in the Battle of France during the Second World War. The battle was fought at the same time as the Siege of Calais, just before Operation Dynamo, the evacuation of the British Expeditionary Force (BEF) from Dunkirk. After the Franco-British counter-attack at the Battle of Arras on 21 May, German units were held ready to resist a resumption of the attack on 22 May.  (Lieutenant-General) Heinz Guderian, the commander of XIX Corps, protested that he wanted to rush north up the Channel coast to capture Boulogne, Calais and Dunkirk. An attack by part of XIX Corps was not ordered until  on 22 May, by which time the Allied troops at Boulogne had been reinforced from England by most of the 20th Guards Brigade.

About eighty light bombers of the Royal Air Force (RAF) flew sorties in support of the defenders of the port.

Royal Navy ships shot their way into and out of the harbour; French and British destroyers bombarded German positions as wounded and non-combatants were embarked and a navy demolition party landed. During a lull in the afternoon of 23 May, the  bombed the harbour, despite being intercepted by RAF fighters. At  the Guards Brigade was ordered to re-embark; the British destroyers ran the gauntlet of German tanks and artillery to dock. The French defenders above the lower town could not be contacted and only in the morning of 24 May did General Lanquetot realise that the British had gone.

The French and the remaining British troops held out until 25 May and then surrendered. Guderian wrote that the halt order and the retention of considerable forces to guard against Allied counter-attacks, forfeited an opportunity quickly to capture the Channel Ports and destroy the Allied forces in northern France and Belgium. An advance on Dunkirk began on 23 May but the next day was halted until 27 May; Dunkirk was not captured until 4 June, by when, most of the BEF and many French and Belgian troops had escaped.

Background

Boulogne

Boulogne-sur-Mer, Calais, Dunkirk and Dieppe, are Channel Ports on the French side at the narrowest part of the English Channel. Boulogne is at the mouth of the fast-flowing River Liane, which meanders through a valley. The harbour is on a level area of ground on either side of the river ; well built-up and with steep roads uphill to the old town ( or the Citadel). The rolling hills make for hidden approaches to the port and offer commanding high ground to an attacker, particularly the Mont St. Lambert ridge. During the Phoney War , the British Expeditionary Force (BEF) had been supplied through ports further to the west, such as Le Havre and Cherbourg but the Channel Ports came into use once mine barrages had been laid  in the English Channel in late 1939, to reduce the demand for ships and escorts. When leave for BEF troops began in December, Boulogne came into use for communication and for troop movements.

Battle of France

On 10 May 1940, the Germans began  (Case Yellow) the offensive against France, Belgium and the Netherlands. Within a few days, the Germans achieved a breakthrough against the centre of the French front near Sedan and drove westwards down the valley of the River Somme. As the BEF withdrew through Belgium into northern France, fewer supply troops were needed as the lines of communication shortened. The British began to withdraw surplus manpower through Boulogne and Calais and on 17 May, Lieutenant-General Douglas Brownrigg, the Adjutant-General of the BEF, moved the Rear General Headquarters (GHQ) from Arras to Boulogne, without informing his French liaison officers. The Germans captured Abbeville at the mouth of the Somme on 21 May, cutting off the Allied troops in Northern France and Belgium from their bases further south.

Eight British 3.7-inch anti-aircraft guns of the 2nd Heavy Anti-Aircraft Regiment, eight machine-guns of the 58th Light Anti-Aircraft Regiment and a battery of the 2nd Searchlight Regiment had arrived from England on 20 May; the French had two  guns, two  guns and two tanks, one of which was unserviceable. On 20 May, the foremost elements of the German XIX Corps ( Heinz Guderian), reached Abbeville. The Channel Ports became the only means of supply and if necessary, evacuation, for the Allies.

Dutfoy heard alarmist reports of the approach of a large German force, apparently from General Jean Pelissier de Féligonde, commander of the 137th Infantry Regiment, which had been attacked by German tanks at Hesdin,  to the south-east of the port. Dutfoy ordered his men to disable the coastal artillery in the forts and to head for the harbour for evacuation; the orders were amplified by other officers. Dutfoy left for Dunkirk in the early hours and discipline broke down, a naval store was broken into and the looters drank the contents. Civilians still waiting for places on evacuation ships began to panic, until  Poher, in charge of the sea front, threatened the crowd with a gun. Some of Dutfoy's men contacted Vice-Admiral Marcel Leclerc, the deputy commander of Dunkirk, who ordered the remaining guns to be preserved for the defence of the town. On a visit to Boulogne early on 22 May, Leclerc ordered the sailors to fight it out and wait for relief by the French and British armies. Admiral Jean Abrial the French commander at Dunkirk issued an order, "You are to die at your posts one by one rather than give in..."

Prelude

Allied defensive preparations

A detachment of Royal Marines arrived in Boulogne in the early morning of 21 May. The 20th Guards Brigade (Brigadier William Fox-Pitt), consisting of the 2nd Battalion, Welsh Guards and 2nd Battalion, Irish Guards, was training at Camberley on 21 May, when ordered to embark for France. Further British reinforcements, including a regiment of cruiser tanks, were expected from Calais on the following day.

Fox-Pitt deployed his men on the high ground outside the town, liaising with Lanquetot who organised the French troops in the town. Road blocks had been established by a party of about fifty men of the 7th Royal West Kents from Albert, about 100 men of the 262nd Field Company Royal Engineers and anti-aircraft crew held the right flank of the Welsh Guards, along the roads approaching from the south. Fox-Pitt had left a gap in the perimeter between the Welsh left flank and the coast for the reinforcements expected from Calais. There were 1,500 men of No 5 Group Auxiliary Military Pioneer Corps (AMPC), a mixture of recalled reservists and part-trained troops working as labourers, in the town awaiting evacuation, under Lieutenant Colonel Donald Dean VC. Under French command were the fort garrisons and some French and Belgian training units of limited military value. Lanquetot had told Fox-Pitt that the French forces in Boulogne were "folded up" which Fox-Pitt inferred meant that they were ready to give up.

German offensive preparations

Apprehension about another counter-attack led to the XV Corps being held back, a division of the XLI Corps being moved eastwards and the 10th Panzer Division of XIX Corps was detached to guard against a counter-attack from the south. Parts of the 1st Panzer Division (Lieutenant-General Friedrich Kirchner) and 2nd Panzer Division (Lieutenant-General Rudolf Veiel), both formations of XIX Corps, were also held back to defend bridgeheads over the Somme. The 2nd Panzer Division was ordered to advance to Boulogne on a line from Baincthun to Samer, with the 1st Panzer Division as a flank guard on the right, advancing to Desvres and Marquise in case of a counter-attack from Calais.

Battle

22 May

The 2nd Panzer Division formed two columns, one to circle round the town and attack from the north. The southern column made contact first in the early afternoon of 22 May, against the headquarters company of the French 48th Infantry Regiment, the only troops of the 21st Division who were between the Germans and Boulogne. The French clerks, drivers and signallers set up two  guns and two  guns to cover the cross-roads at Nesles, where they delayed the Germans for almost two hours, until they were outflanked. The column arrived at the outskirts of Boulogne in the evening and began shelling and probing the Irish Guards positions south of the town. The Irish knocked out the leading German tank and repulsed later attacks despite the Germans overrunning one of their forward platoons. In the early hours, the Germans attacked the Welsh Guards positions along the coast from the north-east as they began to envelop the town but were forced back each time. Only a few troops of the 21st Infantry Division were able take up its blocking positions near Desvres before the German advance reached them. The French managed to delay the 1st Panzer Division here for much of 22 May before Fox-Pitt was told at  that the French had been forced back to Boulogne by German tanks. Most of the 21st Infantry Division, en route to Boulogne by train, was ambushed by German tanks and dispersed.

23 May

An hour after dawn, Fort de la Crèche near Wimereux, north of Boulogne, was captured by German troops. The possibility of reinforcement from Calais was thwarted by the appearance of German armour at the northern perimeter. Fox-Pitt realised that he would have to defend the port with only the two Guards battalions and the assorted French and British troops already there. The AMPC was hastily combed for men with military experience and armed with rifles taken from the others. The 800 men of the AMPC force were rushed into the gap between the two Guards battalions and another 150 were sent to reinforce the Welsh Guards. The anti-aircraft gunners guarding the southern roads destroyed two German tanks with their 3.7-inch anti-aircraft guns and then retired.

The Germans began a pincer attack on the positions of the Welsh and Irish Guards and by  the southern pincer, backed up by artillery and air support, had made the open slopes around the town untenable; the Guards were forced back into the town. Fliegerkorps VIII ( Wolfram Freiherr von Richthofen) sent  to destroy the fortifications at Boulogne which was of great help to the attacking forces. Vimy arrived at noon with a naval demolition party and Force Buttercup, a Royal Marine shore party, beginning the embarkation of casualties and the AMPC. Fox-Pitt received orders from Vimy to hold Boulogne at all costs, as his radio contact with England had been lost earlier in the day. The Royal Navy and a flotilla of French destroyers led by Capitaine , comprising the large destroyers Chacal and Jaguar with the smaller destroyers Fougueux, Frondeur, Bourrasque, Orage, Foudroyant, Cyclone, Siroco and Mistral, gave fire support to the troops on the outskirts of the town.

The commander of the 2nd Panzer Division found that the British and French in Boulogne were "fighting tenaciously for every inch of ground" and could not tell if the British were evacuating or reinforcing the port. During a lull that afternoon, the destroyer  berthed and began embarking AMPC troops. A  raid was intercepted by Royal Air Force (RAF) Spitfires from  but the commanders of both British destroyers were killed by bomb splinters. Frondeur was hit and disabled by  dive bombers of I./Sturzkampfgeschwader 77, Orage was scuttled and the British destroyer Whitshed was damaged by a near-miss. By  Fox-Pitt had withdrawn the brigade to positions in the town and moved his headquarters nearer to the quay, the better to contact the destroyers, his only link with London. With German artillery having the advantage of observed fire to sweep the docks, he sent a message to London saying "situation grave". Shortly before  Keith received orders for an immediate evacuation of the British and notification that five destroyers were either standing off Boulogne giving fire support or were en route. Fox-Pitt decided to continue with the AMPC evacuation while the Guards conducted a fighting withdrawal to the harbour but communication with the British troops on the perimeter was only possible by dispatch rider. The bridges held by the Guards were demolished by the Royal Engineers before the Irish Guards barricaded the streets with vehicles and withdrew to the harbour. The 800 pioneers commanded by Dean were the last to fall back from the perimeter, as Dean was away from his headquarters when the withdrawal orders arrived. Armed only with rifles, the pioneers had hoped to obstruct the Germans with makeshift roadblock barricades and claimed to have destroyed one tank by igniting petrol under it. Dean used his reserves to relieve two forward posts which had become isolated, resulting in fierce hand-to-hand fighting.

Vimiera and Whitshed replaced Vimy and Keith, embarking many of the Marines and Guards. The harbour was full of ships but two  (group, about 30 aircraft, similar to a RAF wing) of  failed to hit the ships but bombs hitting the quayside near Vimy and Keith caused some casualties. The destroyers  and  arrived and began embarking Force Buttercup and the remainder of the Irish Guards. With Germans in positions overlooking the harbour the Guards and the ships engaged in a duel with the German artillery. German tanks advancing towards the quayside were knocked out by the 4.7 inch guns of Venomous, one tank turning "over and over, like a child doing a cart-wheel". German field guns bombarded the harbour as the destroyer  moved through the narrow entrance channel, and hit Venetia several times. Fires broke out on the ship but it was reversed out and made way for Venomous and Wild Swan which also departed in reverse, Venomous steering with its engines as the rudder had jammed.

24–25 May
The destroyer  arrived after dark and was able to continue the embarkation. On clearing the harbour, the captain signalled that there were still British troops requiring evacuation and Vimiera was sent back, arriving in Boulogne at  The quayside was deserted but when the captain called out by loud hailer many men appeared from hiding; the crew managed to squeeze them aboard. When Vimiera arrived at Dover at   disembarked (including Arnold Ridley). Most of the British troops had gone but about  Guards remained. Lack of wireless sets left three of the Welsh Guards forward companies out of touch and by the time they had found out about the evacuation, two companies were cut off from the docks. The companies split into smaller groups and tried a break-out to the north-east. When he discovered the disaster that had befallen his division, he organised the defence of the town as best he could.

During the night, about  soldiers tried to break out towards Dunkirk but failed. At dawn on 25 May, the Germans attempted an  using grenades and flamethrowers, supported by 88 mm guns and at  Lanquetot surrendered. The  demolished the town and had their first encounter with RAF Fighter Command and lost four aircraft over Boulogne and Calais.

The last British unit in Boulogne was 3 Company, Welsh Guards (Major Windsor Lewis); 3 Company did not reach the docks until daybreak and Vimiera had left. Lewis took over a large party of stragglers in the sheds at the quayside comprising guardsmen,  infantry,   Engineers and  refugees; most of the Pioneers were unarmed. On the evening of 24 May, under fire from tanks and machine-guns, they repulsed a German party which approached the quay in a boat. The Germans captured  troops in Boulogne, the majority of whom were French. Many of the prisoners were put to work repairing the harbour fortifications to resist a British amphibious assault.

Aftermath

Analysis

In the British Official History, Lionel Ellis wrote that the battle showed "how easily misunderstandings may arise between allies in such a confused situation". The 20th Guards Brigade had retired towards the outskirts of Boulogne on the morning of 23 May, after resisting attacks from all sides from  Lanquetot signalled that the British were withdrawing precipitately, perhaps unaware of how fiercely the withdrawal was being contested. Communication between Fox-Pitt and the French headquarters at the Citadel was cut by the German advance between the Citadel and the Guards positions in the lower town. Fox-Pitt received orders to evacuate British troops but not the French. On the morning of 24 May, when Lanquetot discovered that the British had gone there were French complaints about British "desertion". To the British, the Guards had been sent to Boulogne at short notice to hold a BEF trans-shipment port (entrepôt) and when it became redundant the two battalions, insufficient to hold the town, were withdrawn.

Allegations that the British had deserted the French may have influenced Churchill to order the garrison at Calais to fight to the finish during the siege. The decision was controversial as the British at Calais could have been evacuated after they had slowed the German advance towards Dunkirk. Keeping the 10th Panzer Division in reserve during the attacks on Boulogne and Calais meant that the Aa Canal line, the western perimeter of the Dunkirk defences, could not be attacked simultaneously. Without the delay, the preparations of the 20th Guards Brigade in Boulogne might also have been interrupted. The long, exposed flank of Army Group A, the uncertain German hold on Amiens and Abbeville and Allied possession of Arras, meant that the advantageous situation enjoyed by the Germans on 22 May could have changed to the benefit of the Allies. The German delay was not excessive, since it was not known if the Allied counter-attack at Arras was over. In 1954 the naval historian, Stephen Roskill, wrote that the advance of the XIX Corps towards Dunkirk was delayed and the defence of Boulogne "undoubtedly contributed to that end" and assisted the Allies in the Battle of Dunkirk  The Welsh and Irish Guards received the battle honour "Boulogne 1940".

Orders of battle

XIX Corps

From the British official history The War in France and Flanders 1939–1940 (1954 [2004 ed.]) unless indicated.
  (General of Cavalry Paul Ludwig Ewald von Kleist, Chief of Staff Brigadier-General Kurt Zeitzler)
 XIX Corps (General of Cavalry Heinz Guderian)
 1st Panzer Division (Major-General Friedrich Kirchner)
 2nd Panzer Division (Major-General Rudolf Veiel)
 10th Panzer Division (Major-General Ferdinand Schaal)
 XXXXI Corps (Major-General Georg-Hans Reinhardt)
 6th Panzer Division (Brigadier-General Werner Kempf)
 8th Panzer Division (Colonel Erich Brandenberger)

Boulogne garrison

From the British official history The War in France and Flanders 1939–1940 (1954 [2004 ed.]) unless indicated.
 21st Infantry Division (General Pierre Louis Félix Lanquetot)
 Headquarters company, 48th Infantry Regiment
 French and Belgian training units
 20th Guards Brigade Group (Brigadier William Fox-Pitt)
 2nd Battalion, Irish Guards
 2nd Battalion, Welsh Guards
 20th Guards Brigade Anti-Tank Company
 69th Anti-Tank Regiment, Royal Artillery (one battery)
 1,500 men Auxiliary Military Pioneer Corps (untrained)
 Force Buttercup (Royal Marine demolition party)

See also

 Boulogne Bowl, a commemorative silver trophy in recognition of the role of the Pioneer Corps in the 1940 Battle of Boulogne
 Operation Wellhit, the Canadian liberation of Boulogne in 1944
 List of British military equipment of World War II
 List of French military equipment of World War II
 List of Belgian military equipment of World War II
 List of German military equipment of World War II

Notes

Footnotes

Bibliography

Books

Encyclopaedias

Reports

Further reading

External links
 West Point map
 21st Division order of battle
 HMS Venomous signals log and photographs

Conflicts in 1940
1940 in France
Boulogne-sur-Mer
World War II in the Pas-de-Calais
Battle of France
Battles of World War II involving France
Battles of World War II involving Germany
Boulogne
May 1940 events